Gustavo Adolfo de Unanue Aguirre (born 17 October 1973) is a Mexican lawyer and politician affiliated with the National Action Party. He served as Deputy of the LIX Legislature of the Mexican Congress representing Sonora, as well as a local deputy in the LVI Legislature of the Congress of Sonora.

References

1973 births
Living people
Politicians from Puebla
20th-century Mexican lawyers
National Action Party (Mexico) politicians
University of Hermosillo alumni
21st-century Mexican politicians
Deputies of the LIX Legislature of Mexico
Members of the Chamber of Deputies (Mexico) for Sonora